Pay Lake is a lake in Kandiyohi County, in the U.S. state of Minnesota.

Pay Lake Pay was named from the fact a railroad paymaster settled there.

See also
List of lakes in Minnesota

References

Lakes of Minnesota
Lakes of Kandiyohi County, Minnesota